Abhishek Iyengar is an Indian playwright and theatre director. He is a co-founder of Bangalore-based theatre company WeMove Theatre. He writes play in Kannada and English.

Career
Iyengar wrote E=MC2, a thriller play which revolves around the life of a software engineer. The protagonist of the play, a person with schizophrenia, is hired to search the missing Software Engineer and through this quest he explores many other hidden truths. His another play entitled Magadi Days is a political satire. In this play, a local government manipulates the laws because of which the common man suffers. His play Namma Metro (2012) is a symbolic representation of Bangalore. It deals with issues of how a small-time city suddenly gets exposed to globalization and the repercussions occurs due to the same. In 2013, he wrote and directed P.S. I Don't Love You. His play Cocktail is a collection of eight short stories based on the real-life stories of people in India. Each story depicts a different emotion and expression thus adding eight different variations. The play is devised using the 'black-box' concept. His play Anaavarana (The Unveiling) revolves around the subject of reunion of friends after their graduation. Miffed with their own secrets, the six friends try to recollect their graduation days and what percolates out is a series of emotions which were always hidden from each other.

In 2006, he co-founded the WeMove Theatre with Rangraj Bhattacharya. In 2017, he was appointed a WorldTheatre Ambassador as a representative of India for world theatre map, as a part of HowlRound, a project by Emerson College, Boston.

Awards
Iyengar received first prize at Adjust Madkobedi Theatre Festival for his play Mooru Humpugalu.

List of plays

Plays written in English 
 P.S I Don't Love You
 Cocktail
 Malgudi Express (adapted from Malgudi Days written by R. K. Narayan)
 Anaavarana (The Unveiling) (2017), directed by Ranjan S.

Plays written in Kannada
 Namma Metro
 Magadi Days
 E=MC2
 Sambhandagala Sutta

References

External links
 

Indian theatre directors
21st-century Indian dramatists and playwrights
Year of birth missing (living people)
Living people
Indian male dramatists and playwrights